Little Hawk (Lakota: Čhetáŋ Čík’ala) (1836–1900) was an Oglala Lakota war chief and a half-brother of Worm, father of Crazy Horse (Lakota: Tashunka-witko)....

Family
Little Hawk was born about 1836. His father was the holy man variously called Makes the Song or Crazy Horse I. Makes The Song was also the father of Worm (Crazy Horse II), who became the father of the famous Crazy Horse III. Little Hawk was born to a different mother from Worm; her name was Good Haired Otter. In the Lakota extended family scheme, Crazy Horse was thus a brother of Little Hawk.

His wife in the census records is always listed as Sunk-ska-win White Horse Woman (sometimes by misreading as 'White House'). In the Pine Ridge Agency allotment records she is noted as a sister of Iron Hawk. White Horse Woman stated that she was married to Little Hawk for thirty years before his death, which indicates that she was probably not the mother of Little Hawk's children born before 1870, which would be Made an Enemy, Hard to Kill, Yellow Wolf, and Iron Tail. White Horse was the mother of Little Hawk's children born after 1870 – including Chase in Morning, Many Cartridges, and Luke Little Hawk (also known as Hairless).

Name
One of Little Hawk's nephews (younger brother of Crazy Horse 3), whom he gave his name to and took the name Long Face. Nephew Little Hawk was killed in 1871 around the age 29 on a war expedition south of the Platte River. 'Long Face' then took back his name Little Hawk. This naming custom sometimes leads to confusion in attributing deeds to family members

Life
Through the 1860s and 1870s, Little Hawk had participated in the fights alongside his famous nephew – just four years younger - Crazy Horse. According to official data, he was one of the participants in The Battle of the Little Big Horn. Committed by political and personal imperatives to preserve his people's hunting grounds, and reluctant to follow Sitting Bull (Lakota: Tatanka Yotanka) into Canadian exile, Little Hawk chose to fight alongside his nephew against the U.S. troops.

According to General George Crook's notes, Little Hawk " ... appeared to rank next to Crazy Horse in importance, was much like his superior in size and build, but his face was more kindly in expression and he was more fluent in speech; he did most of the talking."

Crazy Horse arrived at Fort Robinson near the Red Cloud agency on May 6, 1877; together with Little Hawk, He Dog, Little Big Man, Iron Crow, they met in a solemn ceremony
with First Lieutenant William P. Clark as the first step in their formal surrender. Some who witnessed the surrender caught the glint of silver on Little Hawk's neck. The
shimmering came from a peace medal stamped with the image of President James Monroe. According to John G. Bourke's On the Border with Crook, when Little Hawk and Crazy Horse surrendered in 1877 Bourke noticed "...Little Hawk wore pendent at his neck the silver medal given to his father at the Peace Conference on the North Platte, in 1817 it bore the effigy of President Monroe." However, other accounts note that Little Hawk mentioned that the peace medal had been presented to his grandfather and that his grandfather had passed it along to him. After sixty years' wear, the symbol of friendship had become a mere decoration.

The last of the Northern Oglala tiyóšpaye was the Hunkpatila, Crazy Horse's own band. The Hunkpatila was an offshoot of Young Man Afraid of His Horses agency band, and the chief had sincerely attempted to integrate his Northern kinsmen into the smooth running of reservation life. Since the death of Crazy Horse, Hunkpatila leadership devolved to his father's half-brother Little Hawk, whose loyalties to his nephew's memory deeply conflicted with the interest of Commission of Indian Affairs. The festering resentment against Little Big Man focused within the Hunkpatila. (after surrendering along with Crazy Horse, Little Big Man switched allegiance and is suspected of involvement in Crazy Horse's murder at Fort Robinson in Nebraska.)

At beginning of 1878, convinced by their warriors, Little Hawk's and He Dog's Oglala tiyospaye "escape" from the agency to join the resistance by Sitting Bull. A few Brulés, led by Black Eagle, a Sans Arc Indian, and the Miniconjou leader Roman Nose - had nevertheless resisted pressure to assimilate to the reservation bands - are between the group. In all, some eighty lodges fled, including approximately twenty lodges of Miniconjous, fifty lodges of Oglalas, and ten lodges of straggling Brulés and Sans Arcs. Northern Oglala headmen Iron Crow, leader of a mixed Hunkpatila-Oyuhpe band, and White Twin, a Bad Face leader, fled about the eleventh. The fugitives hurried northwest, pausing to regroup at the staging camp near the junction of Elk Creek and the south fork of the Cheyenne River. The fugitives reorganized, the council of warriors nominating Little Hawk as the Pipe Owner for the projected flight. A Sun Dance was held to promote the spirit of solidarity. They "called to the Great Spirit to protect them, and carry them safely through to the British Possessions."

Sending ahead nine men and a woman to inform Sitting Bull of their march, the village pressed on. Little Hawk coordinated the journey well, skillfully eluding army patrols to slip over the Canadian line during March and reuniting with the November breakaways in a village estimated at 250 lodges by the Canadian authorities. Including the earlier departures, Sitting Bull's alliance had been strengthened by some 280 lodges in spring 1878, almost doubling its numbers.

For the next three years, the exiles sought to maintain their independence in Canada, but conditions deteriorated rapidly. The buffalo herds, which through the 1870s had contracted northward across Montana Territory, vanished under relentless pressure from the exiles, Canadian Indians and Métis, and American hide hunters.

A final series of surrenders followed as hungry Lakota bands capitulated at military posts along the upper Missouri and Yellowstone and Little Hawk surrendered at Fort Keogh with Big Road in September 1880.

In 1881 the interned Lakotas were transported to Standing Rock Agency and held pending transfer to their home agencies. One year later, 656 Northern Oglalas were released from custody and, under the leadership of Little Hawk, Big Road, He Dog, and Low Dog, transferred home to their kin at Pine Ridge. At the same time, 172 Northern Brulés led by Bull Dog were returned to the new Brulé agency at Rosebud.

Little Hawk participated at Lakota Delegation to Washington on 1888.

On January 6, 1891, after Wounded Knee Massacre, Little Hawk, Big Road, He Dog, Jack Red Cloud, and High Hawk had negotiated the terms of surrender. On January 24, he led a group with about twenty Indians that came to Pine River agency to surrender thirty-one guns, attended the order of General Miles civilians to disarm the Indians.

Death
Little Hawk's last occurrence in the Pine Ridge census is for 1899: he presumably died late that year or early 1900..

Notes

References 
 Mari, Sandoz. Crazy Horse: The Strange Man of the Oglalas. Univ. of Nebraska Press.
 Clark, Robert. The killing of Chief Crazy Horse. Bison Books/Univ. of Nebraska Press.
 Bray, Kingsley M. "We Belong to the North": The Flights of the Northern Indians from the White River Agencies, 1877-1878. Montana: The Magazine of Western History, Summer 2005. 
 Price, Catherine. The Oglala People, 1841-1879: A Political History. Univ. of Nebraska Press.
 Bourke, John Gregory. On the Border with Crook
 Hardorff, Richard G. The Death of Crazy Horse: A Tragic Episode in Lakota History. Univ. of Nebraska Press.
 Cozzens, Peter, ed. Eyewitnesses to the Indian Wars. Stackpole Books.

1836 births
1895 deaths
Lakota leaders